Williams & Glyn's Bank Limited was established in London in 1970, when the Royal Bank of Scotland merged its two subsidiaries in England and Wales, Williams Deacon's Bank Ltd. and Glyn, Mills & Co. In 1985, Williams & Glyn's was fully absorbed into the Royal Bank of Scotland and ceased to trade separately.

The name was revived as a brand by NatWest, as Williams and Glyn.

History

Williams Deacon's Bank and the Manchester & Salford Bank

The London private bank of Williams Deacon & Co can date its history back to 1771 when the partnership of Raymond, Williams, Vere, Lowe and Fletcher was first recorded. It ceased payment in 1825 and was reconstituted with different shareholders as Williams, Deacon, Labouchere & Co, before finally becoming Williams Deacon in 1882. It was acquired by the Manchester & Salford Bank in 1890.

The Manchester & Salford Bank was founded in 1836 as a joint stock bank and became a substantial force in Lancashire banking and by 1890 it had over 45 branches. In that year it acquired Williams Deacon, primarily to obtain the latter's seat on the London Bankers' Clearing House. The registered office was moved to London but the head office remained in Manchester. The bank also changed its name to Williams Deacon & Manchester & Salford Bank, shortened to Williams Deacon's Bank in 1901.

The enlarged bank continued to expand but its commitment to the declining cotton industry after World War I, exacerbated by the effects of the Great Depression, stretched its own finances and, encouraged by the Bank of England, Williams Deacon's was acquired by the Royal Bank of Scotland in 1930.

Glyn, Mills & Co.

Glyn, Mills & Co. was founded as the private bank, Vere, Glyn & Hallifax, in the City of London in 1753 by Joseph Vere, Richard Glyn and Thomas Hallifax. The Vere family interest ended in 1766; William Mills joined in 1772; and when the last of the Hallifaxes departed in 1851 the Bank became known as Glyn, Mills & Company.

Acquisitions included Currie's in 1864, Holt & Co. in 1923 and Child & Co. in 1924. Child & Company, founded in the 1580s, remains part of RBS Group Wealth Management today. In 1923, it also acquired the private military bank Holt & Co. founded in 1809, which continued to trade separately until merged into the Drummonds Bank business in 1992.

In 1939, the bank was purchased by Royal Bank of Scotland, which became known as the Three Banks Group.

National Bank
The National Bank of Ireland was founded in London in 1835, becoming The National Bank Limited in 1859. The bank's core Irish business was divested to the Governor and Company of the Bank of Ireland as National Bank of Ireland in 1966. The remaining branches in England and Wales were acquired by National Commercial Bank of Scotland (itself formed by the 1959 merger of National Bank of Scotland and Commercial Bank of Scotland), although they continued to trade separately.

In 1969, National Commercial Bank merged with the Royal Bank of Scotland and, in 1970, the National Bank branches became part of the newly formed Williams & Glyn's Bank, consolidating their interests south of the border. In 1972, Williams & Glyn's and five other banks formed the Inter-Alpha Group of Banks, of which RBS Group remains a member, to exploit opportunities in the then European Economic Community.

Proposed revival of the brand

In 2000, the Royal Bank of Scotland Group acquired National Westminster Bank in a hostile takeover. In 2009 it was announced that all 311 Royal Bank branches in England and Wales together with the seven Scottish branches of NatWest were to be divested by the troubled group, possibly under the dormant Williams & Glyn's brand, to comply with European Union state aid requirements. The process was expected to take up to four years to complete.

In March 2010, it was reported that the group had issued a sales memorandum for the business, which would include 318 branches and around £20 billion in loans provided to small businesses and households. Following the deadline for initial bids on 7 April, Santander Group, Virgin Money, National Australia Bank, BBVA and the private equity firm JC Flowers were all confirmed to have submitted bids for consideration. It was announced on 3 August that the Spanish Santander Group would pay around £1.65 billion for the branches, expected to be rebranded as part of Santander UK, in a deal set to be completed by December 2013. Santander withdrew from the sale on 12 October 2012.

On 27 September 2013, the Royal Bank of Scotland Group confirmed it had agreed to sell 308 Royal Bank of Scotland branches in England and Wales and 6 NatWest branches in Scotland to the Corsair consortium. The branches were due to be divested from the group in 2016 as a standalone business operating under the Williams & Glyn name. The deal was modified to 314 branches incorporating 250,000 small business customers, 1,200 medium business customers and 1.8 million personal banking customers.  With the proposed unit initially planned to be called Williams & Glyn's Bank, it was announced in December 2013 that the bank name would be shortened to Williams & Glyn owing to the difficulty of using an apostrophe in branding and website addresses. The name Glyn is historically accurate however, as the bank was originally formed by merging Williams Deacon's Bank with Glyn, Mills & Co.

The historic Williams and Glyn's Bank did not have a distinct logo, instead it used the "Daisy Wheel" logo of its parent company, The Royal Bank of Scotland. A logo for Williams and Glyn was designed by Landor Associates in April 2014. The logo featured the words "Williams" and "Glyn" joined by a large ampersand.

Failed spinoff and closed branches
On 16 December 2015, RBS confirmed it had received a number of informal offers for the bank, and would seek to complete a sale by the end of 2017. HM Treasury subsequently announced it had asked the Competition and Markets Authority to suspend a review into how competitive the bank would be in the UK banking sector.

In August 2016, RBS cancelled its plan to spin off Williams & Glyn as a separate business, stating that the new bank could not survive independently given the exigencies involved in Brexit. It revealed it would instead seek to sell the operation to another bank. Reuters reported that Santander UK was interested in buying the unit outright. Santander had abandoned talks in September 2016. CYBG plc, owner of Clydesdale Bank and Yorkshire Bank, confirmed in October 2016 that it had made what it described as a "preliminary non-binding proposal" for the unit. In the same month RBS confirmed that it would be unable to sell Williams & Glyn by the end of 2017, potentially giving the European Commission the right to take control of the sales process.

RBS was ordered to sell Williams & Glyn by regulators as part of the bank's obligations for receiving state aid during the government bailout in 2009 after the 2008 financial crisis. However, RBS was unable to find a buyer for what were several RBS banks in England and Wales, as well as NatWest branches in Scotland, branded under the resurrected Williams & Glyn name. RBS ultimately avoided the mandatory sale by deal-making with the government, earning approval to reintegrate Williams & Glyn and the associated branch network into its core bank. In February 2017, HM Treasury suggested that the bank should abandon the plan to sell the operation, and instead focus on initiatives to boost competition within business banking in the United Kingdom. This plan was formally approved by the European Commission in September 2017. As an alternative to divesting of Williams & Glyn, RBS agreed to create a $1 billion fund to support competing companies, as part of an agreement with the Treasury and the European Commission. This final agreement, known as the "Alternative Remedies Package", was reached with the European Commission in September 2017, allowing RBS Group to retain the Williams & Glyn assets and bringing the sale process to a close.
	
After creating the fund, RBS considered relaunching Williams & Glyn as a new brand, but risks led to the bank abandoning the idea, and in May 2018, it was announced that 162 RBS branches in England or Wales that were to have become Williams & Glyn would be closed, resulting in almost 800 job losses, with customers able to use nearby NatWest branches for counter services instead.  The 162 branches were closed June of 2018 as a result. 

The closure of a further 54 branches was announced in September 2018 with an expected loss of 258 jobs. RBS said it was closing branches in close proximity to each other to reduce overlap, with the branches officially closed in January 2019. The BBC quoted the Unite union criticizing the move, in part for limiting easy access to disabled and elderly customers. The closures left 54 RBS branches in England and Wales total. 

In July of 2020 the Royal Bank of Scotland Group rebranded itself as NatWest Group, with the bank continuing to operate as NatWest and Williams & Glyn outside of Scotland.

See also

Williams & Glyn's Bank v Boland
 Roger Fulford,  Glyn’s 1753–1953 (1953)
 Eric Gore Browne, Glyn, Mills & Co (1933)

References

External links
The Royal Bank of Scotland Group
RBS Branch Information

Royal Bank of Scotland
Defunct banks of the United Kingdom
Banks established in 1970
Banks disestablished in 1985
Glyn family
British companies established in 1970
British companies disestablished in 1985